Modernism in the Catholic Church attempts to reconcile Catholicism with modern culture, specifically an understanding of the Bible and Catholic tradition in light of the historical-critical method and new philosophical and political developments of the late 19th and early 20th centuries.

The term modernism—generally used by critics of rather than adherents to positions associated with it—came to prominence in Pope Pius X's 1907 encyclical Pascendi Dominici gregis. The Pope condemned modernism as "the synthesis of all heresies".

Writing in the Catholic Encyclopedia in 1911, the Jesuit Arthur Vermeersch gave a definition of modernism in the perspective of the Catholic heresiology of his time: "In general we may say that modernism aims at that radical transformation of human thought in relation to God, man, the world, and life, here and hereafter, which was prepared by Humanism and eighteenth-century philosophy, and solemnly promulgated at the French Revolution."

The modernist movement was influenced and accompanied by Protestant theologians and clergy like Paul Sabatier and Heinrich Julius Holtzmann. On the other hand, modernist theologians were critical of Protestant theology and engaged in apologetics of the Catholic Church against a Protestant understanding of Christianity, as in the famous attack of Alfred Loisy in L'Évangile et l'Église (1902) on Adolf von Harnack's Das Wesen des Christentums (1900). The modernist movement has a parallel in the Church of England where the journal The Modern Churchman was founded in 1911.

The controversy on modernism was prominent in French and British intellectual circles and, to a lesser extent, in Italy, but, in one way or another, concerned most of Europe and North America. Pope Pius X saw modernism as a universal threat which required a global reaction.

Dimensions of the controversy over Modernism

Although the so-called modernists did not form a uniform movement, they responded to a common constellation of religious problems around 1900, which transcended Catholicism: First of all the problem of historicism which seemed to render all historical forms of faith and tradition relative. Secondly, through the reception of modern philosophers like Immanuel Kant, Maurice Blondel, and Henri Bergson the neo-scholastic philosophical and theological framework set up by Pope Leo XIII became fragile. The assertion that objective truth is received subjectively is indeed fundamental for the entire controversy. This focus on the religious subject engendered a renewed interest in mysticism, sanctity and religious experience in general. The aversion against a religious "extrinsicism" also led to a new hermeneutics for doctrinal definitions which were seen as secondary formulations of an antecedent (immanent) religious experience (George Tyrrell; cfr. also the Christian personalism of Lucien Laberthonnière).

The controversy was not restricted to the field of philosophy and theology. On the level of politics, Christian Democrats like the layman Marc Sangnier in France and the priest Romolo Murri in Italy, but also the left wing of the Centre Party and the Christian Unions in Germany, opted for a political agenda which was no more completely controlled by the hierarchy. Pope Pius X reacted by excommunicating Murri in 1909, by dissolving Sangnier's Sillon movement in 1910, and by issuing the encyclical Singulari quadam in 1912 which clearly favoured the German Catholic workers' associations over against the Christian Unions. Furthermore, antimodernists like Albert Maria Weiss OP and the Swiss Caspar Decurtins, which were both favoured by Pius X, would even find "literary modernism" on the field of the Catholic belles-lettres which did not meet their standards of orthodoxy.

In the eyes of the antimodernist reaction, the "modernists" were a uniform and secret sect within the church. In a historical perspective, one can discern networks of personal contacts between "modernists", especially around Friedrich von Hügel and Paul Sabatier. On the other hand, there was a great bandwidth of opinions within the "movement", from people ending up in rationalism (e.g. Marcel Hébert, Albert Houtin, Salvatore Minocchi, Joseph Turmel) to a mild religious reformism, even including neo-scholastic theologians like Romolo Murri. This perception of a broad movement from left to right was already shaped by the protagonists themselves.

Terminology: From Liberal Catholicism to Modernism

"Liberal Catholicism" designated originally a current of thought within the Catholic Church that was influential in the 19th century, especially in France, and aimed at reconciling the church with liberal democracy. It was largely identified with French political theorists such as Felicité Robert de Lamennais, Henri Lacordaire, and Charles Forbes René de Montalembert. In the second half of the 19th century the term was also applied to theologians and intellectuals like Ignaz von Döllinger, St. George Jackson Mivart, John Zahm, and Franz Xaver Kraus who wanted to reconcile the Catholic faith with the standards of modern science and society in general.

In 1881, the Belgian economist Charles Périn, a conservative Catholic layman, published a volume titled Le modernisme dans l’église d’après les lettres inédites de La Mennais. Périn was the first author to use the term "modernism" in a Catholic context – before him the Dutch Calvinist Abraham Kuyper had attacked the rationalist German theology of the Protestant Tübingen School as "modernism" (Het modernisme een fata morgana op christelijk gebied, 1871). For Périn "modernism" was a label for the attempts of Liberal Catholics to reconcile Catholicism with the ideals of the French Revolution and of democracy in general. He saw the danger that humanitarian tendencies in secular society would be received within the Catholic Church. This "social" definition of Catholic Modernism would be taken up again later by Integralism. Périn's usage of the term "modernism" was accepted by the Roman journal of the Jesuits, the semi-official Civiltà Cattolica, which added the aspect of an exaggerated trust in modern science to this concept. When five exegetical books of the French theologian Alfred Loisy were placed on the Index of Forbidden Books in December 1903, the official papal paper L'Osservatore Romano distinguished between "modernity" and "modernism", which entailed heresy in religion, revolution in politics, and error in philosophy. The term "modernism" now began to replace older labels like "Liberal Catholicism" or (especially in Germany) "Reform Catholicism".

The connection between "Liberal Catholicism" and "Modernism" has been subject to controversial discussion. In 1979, Thomas Michael Loome stressed the continuity between the two and talked of a "vertical dimension" of the modernist controversy. This "invention of tradition" was criticized – amongst others – by Nicholas Lash. It is clear, however, that already the Joint Pastoral of the English episcopate against "Liberal Catholicism" (December 1900) did not only react on St. George Jackson Mivart, but also on the writings of the later "modernist" George Tyrrell. The letter had been prepared in Rome and was inspired by Rafael Merry del Val who became Tyrrell's chief opponent under Pius X. Furthermore, "modernists" like Tyrrell compared their own difficulties after the publication of Pascendi with the difficulties of "liberal catholics" like Ignaz von Döllinger after Vatican I. In December 1907, Tyrrell wrote to a German correspondent: "Is it not time to reconsider the pseudo-council of 1870 and to ask whether the Alt-Katholiks were not, after all, in the right? Ex fructibus eorum etc. [You will know them by their fruits. Matthew 7:16] may surely be used as a criterion of Ultramontanism. Individuals, like myself, can afford to stand aloof as Döllinger did. But can multitudes live without sacraments and external communion? And yet now no educated man or woman will be able to remain in communion with Pius X." Tyrrell was also inspired by the posthumous publication of Lord Acton's History of Freedom and Other Essays in 1907.

History of the Modernist controversy
Although the so-called "Modernist Crisis" is usually dated between 1893 (Pope Leo XIII, Encyclical Providentissimus Deus) and 1914 (death of Pope Pius X), the controversy has had a pre-history and also a post-history.

Pre-history: 19th century intellectual ferment

With notable exceptions like Richard Simon or the Bollandists, Catholic studies in the seventeenth, eighteenth and nineteenth centuries had tended to avoid the use of critical methodology because of its rationalist tendencies. Frequent political revolutions, bitter opposition of "liberalism" to the Church and the expulsion of religious orders from France and Germany had made the church understandably suspicious of the new intellectual currents.

In his encyclical of 1829 Traditi humilitati, Pope Pius VIII had admonished those who "publish the Bible with new interpretations contrary to the Church's laws" and "skillfully distort the meaning by their own interpretation", in order to "ensure that the reader imbibes their lethal poison instead of the saving water of salvation". 

In similar vein, in 1832 his successor Pope Gregory XVI condemned in his encyclical Mirari vos "shameless science" ("scientia impudens") deploring that the "divine authority of the Church is ... subjected to human reason". Gregory also warned Catholics not to read translations of the Bible published by non-Catholic biblical societies, accusing them in his encyclical Inter praecipuas (1844) of  "scorning divine tradition preserved by the Catholic Church in the teaching of the Fathers" and of "repudiating the very authority of the Church". 

Anti-liberalism and hostility towards modernity continued with the new Pope Pius IX: a few months after his election in 1846, Pius promulgated the encyclical Qui pluribus, exhorting all Catholic prelates to be on guard against the dangers posed by rationalism, pantheism, socialism, communism and other popular philosophies. 

In 1863, Ernest Renan published Vie de Jésus (Life of Jesus). Renan had trained for the priesthood before choosing a secular career as a philologist and historian. His book described Jesus as "un homme incomparable", a man, no doubt extraordinary, but only a man. The book was very popular, but cost him his chair of Hebrew at the Collège de France. Among Renan's most controversial ideas was that "a miracle does not count as a historical event; people believing in a miracle does." Renan's Jesus is a man of simple piety and almost unimaginable charisma whose main historical significance was his legion of followers.

In the same year 1863, the Church historian Ignaz von Döllinger invited about 100 German theologians to meet in Munich (Münchener Gelehrtenversammlung, 1863) to discuss the state of Catholic theology. In his address, "On the Past and Future of Catholic Theology", Döllinger advocated greater academic freedom of theology within the church, formulating a critique of neo-scholastic theology and championing the historical method in theology. Also in the year 1863, Döllinger's friend Charles de Montalembert gave two powerful speeches at the Catholic Congress in Malines, insisting that the church had to reconcile itself with civil equality and religious freedom.

On 8 December 1864 Pope Pius IX issued the encyclical Quanta cura, decrying what he considered significant errors afflicting the modern age. It condemned certain propositions such as: "the people's will, manifested by what is called public opinion..., constitutes a supreme law, free from all divine and human control"; on civil law alone depend all rights of parents over their children, and especially that of providing for education; and that religious orders have no legitimate reason for being permitted. Some of these condemnations were aimed at anticlerical governments in various European countries, which were in the process of secularizing education and taking over Catholic schools, as well as suppressing religious orders and confiscating their property. Attached to the encyclical was a Syllabus Errorum which had been condemned in previous papal documents, requiring recourse to the original statements to be understood. The Syllabus reacted not only to modern atheism, materialism, and agnosticism, but also to Liberal Catholicism and the new critical study of the Bible. It was also a direct reaction to Döllinger's speech in Munich and Montalembert's speeches in Malines. Among the propositions condemned in the Syllabus were:

 "7. The prophecies and miracles set forth and recorded in the Sacred Scriptures are the fiction of poets, and the mysteries of the Christian faith the result of philosophical investigations. In the books of the Old and the New Testament there are contained mythical inventions, and Jesus Christ is Himself a myth."
 "13. The method and principles by which the old scholastic doctors cultivated theology are no longer suitable to the demands of our times and to the progress of the sciences." — Letter to the Archbishop of Munich "Tuas libenter," Dec. 21, 1863.
 "15. Every man is free to embrace and profess the Religion he shall believe true, guided by the light of reason." — Apostolic Letter "Multiplices inter", 10 June 1851. Allocution "Maxima quidem", 9 June 1862.

The First Council of the Vatican was held from December 1869 to October 1870.  The council provoked a degree of controversy even before it met. In anticipation that the subject of papal infallibility would be discussed, many bishops, especially in France and Germany, expressed the opinion that the time was "inopportune". Ignaz von Döllinger led a movement in Germany hostile to the definition of infallibility. In Döllinger's view, there was no foundation for this definition in Catholic tradition. After the definition, Döllinger was excommunicated by the Archbishop of Munich Gregor von Scherr in 1871. Montalembert died before the end of the Council.

The dogmatic Constitution on the Catholic Faith, Dei Filius, tried to steer a middle way between rationalism and fideism. It presented a concept of revelation which highlighted the aspect of divine instruction by revelation. The dogmatic Constitution Pastor Aeternus addressed the primacy of the pope and rejected the idea that decrees issued by the pope for the guidance of the church are not valid unless confirmed by the secular power. It also declared the infallibility of the pope when speaking "ex cathedra" on matters of faith and morals. Other matters were deferred when the Italian infantry entered Rome and the council was prorogued. The Council remained formally open until 1960, when it was officially closed by Pope John XXIII, in order to convene the Second Council of the Vatican.

The First Vatican Council's decisions were so controversial that they even caused a schism of some German, Swiss, Austrian and Dutch liberal Catholics, who broke away from the Vatican and merged with the Jansenists (who had maintained a somewhat precarious hierarchy in the Netherlands) into the Old Catholic Church, which still exists to this day.

The beginning of the Modernist controversy under Leo XIII

Pope Leo XIII, Pius IX's successor, wanted to advance what he understood as the true Christian science in every way: He worked for a revival of Thomism as Christian philosophy, he encouraged the study of history and archaeology, and in 1881 he opened up the Vatican Archives for researchers.
In 1887 he encouraged the study of the natural sciences, and in 1891 opened a new Vatican Observatory. Leo's response to the rationalist trend to undermine the authority of sacred scripture, was for the church to have its own trained experts. In 1893, with Providentissimus Deus, Pope Leo gave the first formal authorization for the use of critical methods in biblical scholarship. "Hence it is most proper that Professors of Sacred Scripture and theologians should master those tongues in which the sacred Books were originally written, and have a knowledge of natural science. He recommended that the student of scripture be first given a sound grounding in the interpretations of the Fathers such as Tertullian, Cyprian, Hilary, Ambrose, Leo the Great, Gregory the Great, Augustine and Jerome, and understand what they interpreted literally, and what allegorically; and note what they lay down as belonging to faith and what is opinion.

Although Providentissimus Deus tried to encourage Catholic biblical studies, it created also problems. In the encyclical, Leo XIII excluded the possibility of restricting the inspiration and inerrancy of the bible to matters of faith and morals. Thus, he interfered in the lively discussion about biblical inspiration in France, where Maurice d'Hulst, the founder of the Institut Catholique de Paris, had opted for a more open solution in his article on La question biblique. Not only exegetes of this "école large" were now in trouble, but also the prominent French theologian Alfred Loisy who worked for a thoroughly historical understanding of the Bible, in order to open up spaces for theological reform. The Roman Congregation of the Index began to prepare a censuring of Loisy's main works, but until the death of Leo XIII in 1903 no decision was taken, as there was also considerable resistance within the Roman Curia against a premature judgment on matters of biblical interpretation.

On the whole, the official Catholic attitude to the study of Sacred Scripture at the turn of the 20th century was one of cautious advance, and at the same time of a growing appreciation of what had promise for the future. In 1902, Pope Leo XIII instituted the Pontifical Biblical Commission, which was to adapt Catholic Biblical studies to modern scholarship and to protect Scripture against attacks.

Marie-Joseph Lagrange
In 1890 the École Biblique, the first Catholic school specifically dedicated to the critical study of the bible, was established in Jerusalem by Dominican Marie-Joseph Lagrange. In 1892 Pope Leo XIII gave his official approval. While many of Lagrange's contemporaries criticized the new scientific and critical approach to the Bible, he made use of it. Lagrange founded the Revue Biblique, and his first articles drew sharp criticism, but Pope Leo was not inclined to discourage new ideas. As long as Pope Leo lived, Lagrange's work quietly progressed, but after Leo's death, an ultra-conservative reaction set in. The Historical-Critical Method was considered suspect by the Vatican. Père Lagrange, like other scholars involved in the 19th-century renaissance of biblical studies, was suspected of being a Modernist. In 1912 Lagrange was given an order for the Revue Biblique to cease publication and to return to France. The École itself was closed for a year, and then Lagrange was sent back to Jerusalem to continue his work.

Duchesne and Loisy 

Louis Duchesne was a French priest, philologist, teacher, and amateur archaeologist. Trained at the École pratique des Hautes Études in Paris, he applied modern methods to church history, drawing together archaeology and topography to supplement literature and setting ecclesiastical events within the contexts of social history. Duchesne held the chair of ecclesiastical history at the Institut Catholique de Paris, and was frequently in contact with like-minded historians among the Bollandists, with their long history of critical editions of hagiographies. Duchesne gained fame as a demythologizing critical historian of the popular, pious lives of saints produced by Second Empire publishers. However, his Histoire ancienne de l'Église, 1906‑11 (translated as Early History of the Christian Church) was considered too modernist by the church at the time, and was placed on the Index of Forbidden Books in 1912.

Alfred Loisy was a French Catholic priest, professor and theologian generally credited as the "father of Catholic Modernism". He had studied at the Institut Catholique under Duchesne and attended the course on Hebrew by Ernest Renan at the Collège de France. Harvey Hill says that the development of Loisy's theories have to be seen also in the context of France's Church-State conflict, which contributed to Loisy's crisis of faith in the 1880s. In November 1893, Loisy published the last lecture of his course, in which he summed up his position on biblical criticism in five propositions: the Pentateuch was not the work of Moses, the first five chapters of Genesis were not literal history, the New Testament and the Old Testament did not possess equal historical value, there was a development in scriptural doctrine, and Biblical writings were subject to the same limitations as those by other authors of the ancient world. When his attempts at theological reform had failed, Loisy came to regard the Christian religion more as a system of humanistic ethics than as divine revelation. He was excommunicated in 1908.

The climax of the controversy under Pius X 

Pope Pius X, who succeeded Leo XIII in August 1903, engaged almost immediately in the ongoing controversy. Reacting on pressure from the Parisian Archbishop Cardinal François-Marie-Benjamin Richard, he transferred the censuring of Loisy from the Congregation of the Index to the Supreme Sacred Congregation of the Holy Office. Already in December 1903, Loisy's main exegetical works were censured. At the same time the Holy Office began to prepare a syllabus of errors contained in the works of Loisy. Due to ongoing internal resistance, especially from the Master of the Sacred Palace, the papal theologian Alberto Lepidi OP, this Syllabus was published only in July 1907 as the decree Lamentabili sane exitu, which condemned sixty-five propositions from the field of biblical interpretation and the history of dogma. Lamentabili did not mention the term "modernism", and it seems that Pius X and his close collaborators like Cardinal Rafael Merry del Val and Cardinal José de Calasanz Vives y Tutó were not satisfied with the document.

Therefore, in the summer of 1907, another document was prepared in a small circle around the pope, and already in September 1907 Pius X promulgated the encyclical Pascendi dominici gregis, which formulated a synthesis of modernism and popularized the term itself. The encyclical condemned modernism as embracing every heresy. Pascendi described the "modernist" in seven "roles": as purely immanentist philosopher, as believer who relies only on his own religious experience, as theologian who understands dogma symbolically, as historian and biblical scholar who dissolves divine revelation by means of the historical-critical method into purely immanent processes of development, as apologete who justifies the Christian truth only from immanence, and as reformer who wants to change the church in a radical way. Agnosticism, immanentism, evolutionism and reformism are the keywords used by the pope to describe the philosophical and theological system of modernism. The modernist is an enemy of scholastic philosophy and theology and resists the teachings of the magisterium. His moral qualities are curiosity, arrogance, ignorance, and falsehood. Modernists deceive the simple believers by not presenting their entire system, but only parts of it. Therefore, the encyclical wants to reveal the secret system of modernism. Pascendi contained also disciplinary measures for the promotion of scholastic philosophy and theology in the seminaries, for the removal of suspect professors and candidates for the priesthood, for a more rigid censuring of publications and for the creation of an antimodernist control group in every diocese. All bishops and superiors of religious orders had to report regularly on the execution of these measures.

Pius frequently condemned the movement, and was deeply concerned that its adherents could go on believing themselves strict Catholics while understanding dogma in a markedly untraditional sense (a consequence of the notion of evolution of dogma). Therefore, in 1910, he introduced an anti-modernist oath to be taken by all Catholic priests, while he shut down "the only notable American Catholic magazine", the Ecclesiastical Review "precisely when it was needed to challenge the increasing influence of John Dewey's pragmatism."

To ensure enforcement of these decisions, Monsignor Umberto Benigni organized, through his personal contacts with theologians and laymen in various European countries, a secret network of informants who would report to him those thought to be teaching condemned doctrine or engaging in political activities (like Christian Democratic Parties, Christian Unions) which were also deemed to be "modernist" because they were not controlled by the Catholic hierarchy. This group was called the Sodalitium Pianum, i.e. Fellowship of Pius (V), the code name was La Sapinière. Its frequently overzealous and clandestine methods often hindered rather than helped the Church in its combat with modernism. Benigni also published the journal La Corrispondenza Romana/Correspondance de Rome which initiated press campaigns against practical and social modernism throughout Europe. Benigni fell out with Cardinal Secretary of State Rafael Merry del Val in 1911. The Sodalitium was eventually dissolved in 1921. Recent research has stressed the antisemitic character of Benigni's antimodernism.

In America 

With his slogan "Church and Age unite!", Archbishop John Ireland of Saint Paul, Minnesota, became the hero of reformers in France (Félix Klein), Italy and Germany (Herman Schell) in the 1890s. The modernist controversy in the United States was thus initially dominated by the conflict on "Americanism", which after Pascendi was also presented as a "forerunner" of modernism in  Catholic heresiology. "Americanism" was perceived as an influence of classical liberalism in the Catholic Church in the United States, particularly regarding the concept of separation of Church and State. Such tendencies alarmed Pope Leo XIII, who condemned them in his apostolic letter Testem benevolentiae nostrae (1899). Archbishop Ireland had to be extremely careful to avoid condemnation for his views.

Following the issuing of Pascendi, the antimodernist measures were especially felt in the Archdiocese of New York: The New York Review was a journal produced by Saint Joseph's Seminary. It printed papers by leading Catholic Biblical experts who were part of the newly emerging schools of Biblical criticism, which raised eyebrows in Rome. Around 1908, the Review was discontinued, ostensibly for financial reasons, although there is strong evidence that it was suppressed for modernist tendencies. Despite his support for modernization, Archbishop Ireland actively campaigned against modernism following the Pascendi encyclical: this apparently inconsistent behavior stemmed from Ireland's concept of a "golden mean" between "ultraconservatism", rendering the Church irrelevant, and "ultraliberalism," discarding the Church's message.

Post-history in the twentieth and twenty-first centuries 
After the pontificate of Pius X, there was a gradual abatement of attacks against modernists. The new Pope Benedict XV, who was elected to succeed Pius X in 1914, once again condemned modernism in his encyclical Ad beatissimi Apostolorum, but also urged Catholics to cease condemning fellow believers. Nevertheless, theological antimodernism continued to influence the climate within the church. The Holy Office, until 1930 under the guidance of Cardinal Rafael Merry del Val, continued to censure modernist theologians and rationalist exegesis was once again condemned by the Pontiff in his encyclical Spiritus Paraclitus.

In the 1930s, Loisy's opera omnia were placed on the Index Librorum Prohibitorum. During World War I, French Catholic propaganda claimed that the German Catholics were infected by modernism. Already in 1913 it had been claimed by the French academic Edmond Vermeil that the Catholic Tübingen School in the mid-19th century, with its interest for the "organic development" of the church in history, was a "forerunner" of "modernism" – a claim which has been contested ever since.

Between World War I and the Second Vatican Council, Réginald Garrigou-Lagrange  was a "torchbearer of orthodox Thomism" against modernism. Garrigou-Lagrange, who was a professor of philosophy and theology at the Pontifical University of St. Thomas Aquinas, Angelicum, is commonly held to have influenced the decision in 1942 to place the privately circulated book Une école de théologie: le Saulchoir (Étiolles-sur-Seine 1937) by Marie-Dominique Chenu  on the Vatican's "Index of Forbidden Books" as the culmination of a polemic within the Dominican Order between the Angelicum supporters of a speculative scholasticism and the French revival Thomists who were more attentive to historical hermeneutics, such as Yves Congar 

At the beginning of the 1930s, Congar read the Mémoires of Loisy and realised that modernism had addressed problems in theology which were still not resolved by scholastic theology. Chenu and Congar, two protagonists of the Nouvelle théologie, began to prepare a dossier on this topic. In 1946, Congar wrote to Chenu that scholastic theology had already begun to "liquidate" itself on a daily basis and that the Jesuits were among the fiercest "liquidators".
Congar's Chrétiens désunis was also suspected of modernism because its methodology derived more from religious experience than from syllogistic analysis. As a result, the Nouvelle théologie was condemned by Pope Pius XII in his encyclical Humani generis.

A first relaxation of the strict anti-modernist measures imposed by Pius X came in 1943: on that year, Pope Pius XII issued the encyclical Divino afflante Spiritu, regulating the issue of biblical exegesis. The encyclical inaugurated the modern period of Roman Catholic biblical studies by encouraging the study of textual criticism (or lower criticism), pertaining to text of the Scriptures themselves and transmission thereof (for example, to determine correct readings) and permitted the use of the historical-critical method (or higher criticism), to be informed by theology, Sacred Tradition, and ecclesiastical history on the historical circumstances of the text, hypothesizing about matters such as authorship, dating, and similar concerns. Catholic biblical scholar Raymond E. Brown  described the encyclical as a "Magna Carta for biblical progress". 

The Second Council of the Vatican in the 1960s is seen by some as a vindication of much that the modernists maintained "in an environment of suspicion and unrelenting personal attack". The aggiornamento of the council incorporated most of the advances in biblical and church studies that had been put forth by Catholic scholars over the previous century. From the post-Vatican II perspective of 2010, theologian Ellen Leonard  offered an interpretation of Modernism as "a movement for renewal within Catholicism that offered an alternative to the liberal Protestant outlook and in some ways anticipated the Second Vatican Council." 

According to the Jesuit theologian Christoph Theobald, Vatican II has tried to resolve the following problems addressed by Alfred Loisy:

 Inspiration of Holy Scripture: Loisy's view that divine inspiration cannot be restricted to certain areas of scripture, but that scripture was at the same time entirely "historical" has found an echo in the dogmatic Constitution Dei Verbum where the principle that divine revelation has happened "for the sake of our salvation" and has been testified by Holy Scripture is combined with the task of scrutinizing Scripture in a historical-exegetical way; 
 In his inaugural address to the Second Vatican Council, Pope John XXIII distinguished between the depositum fidei and its historical forms of expression, thus echoing Loisy's distinction between "truth" and "doctrine"; 
 The transcendental theology of Karl Rahner  has synthesized the opposition of immanentism and extrinsicism which Loisy had problematized in many of his essays. Accordingly, Dei verbum has supplemented the instruction-centered model of revelation in the First Vatican Council by the concept of divine self-communication in history; 
 The concept of doctrinal development has been received in some dialectical formulations in Dei Verbum.

Despite this, condemnation of modernism continued after the Second Vatican Council as well. In his encyclical Ecclesiam suam, Pope Paul VI condemned modernism as "an error which is still making its appearance under various new guises, wholly inconsistent with any genuine religious expression" and described it as "an attempt on the part of secular philosophies and secular trends to vitiate the true teaching and discipline of the Church of Christ".

Reference to modernism continues to be frequent among traditionalist Catholics.

Notable persons involved in the Modernist controversy

John Ireland (1838-1918), Archbishop of Saint Paul. Considered one of the leaders of Americanism, he later turned against modernism
Louis Duchesne (1843-1922), priest and philologist, one of his books was placed on the Index Librorum Prohibitorum
Alfred Loisy (1857-1940), priest and theologian, excommunicated for his views in 1908 and his opera omnia was placed on the Index. Later became an agnostic and a secular scholar at the Collège de France.
George Tyrrell (1861–1909), expelled from the Society of Jesus in 1906 for his views and excommunicated in 1908
Maude Petre (1863–1942), English nun, close friend of Tyrrell, and a participant in the modernist movement as well as one of its first historians and critics
Ernesto Buonaiuti (1881–1946), who as a scholar of the history of Christianity and of religious philosophy, was a leader in the Italian modernist movement and was excommunicated in 1925
Pierre Batiffol (1861–1929), historian of dogma
Friedrich von Hügel (1852-1925), philosopher of religion
Wilfrid Ward (1856–1916), English essayist and biographer 
Henri Bremond (1865–1933), French literary scholar, sometime Jesuit, and Catholic philosopher
Joseph Schnitzer (1859–1939), historian of dogma in Munich
Giovanni Semeria (1867–1931), Barnabite priest, preacher
Carl Muth (1867–1944), editor of the cultural and religious journal Hochland
Herman Schell  (1850–1906), German theologian
Franz Xaver Kraus (1840–1901), church historian, "Liberal Catholic"

In popular culture
 Irish comedian Dermot Morgan parodied the Modernist trend of the Post-Vatican II Catholic Church in Ireland while appearing on the RTÉ television show The Live Mike between 1979 and 1982. On the show, Morgan played a range of comic characters, including Father Trendy, a trying-to-be-cool hippie-priest, who wore an Elvis haircut, a leather jacket and who was given to drawing ludicrous parallels between religious and non-religious life in two-minute 'sermons' to the camera. Morgan's model for the character was Father Brian D'Arcy, a Left Wing Passionist priest who was trying to be the chaplain to the show business community in Dublin.
 In the episode "The Bishops Gambit" of the British TV Series Yes, Prime Minister (Season 1, Episode 7, aired 17 September 1988), Prime Minister Jim Hacker discusses candidates for an Anglican bishopric with Cabinet Secretary Sir Humphrey Appleby. The Church Commissioners have suggested a candidate who is a "modernist". Sir Humphrey later explains to the PM that "Modernist" is Ecclesiastical code for an Atheist Anglican clergyman.

See also

 Americanism (heresy)
 Integrism
 Liberal Catholicism
 Nouvelle Théologie
 Biblical criticism
 Joseph Malègue
 Désiré-Joseph Mercier

References

Bibliography

Cf.

External links
 Bourmaud, Fr. Dominique, One Hundred Years of Modernism: A Genealogy of the Principles of the Second Vatican Council
 — Fr. Réginald Garrigou-Lagrange, O.P., explains why Thomism is the solution to the present crisis of Modernism in the Church.
 Providentissimus Deus, Leo XIII, 18 November 1893
 Lamentabili sane, Pius X, 3 July 1907
 Pascendi dominici gregis, Pius X, 8 September 1907
International Catholic University: James Hitchcock, Introduction to Modernism: Essays with bibliography arranged by subjects, headed "Note: Most of the works dealing with Modernism are sympathetic to the Modernists, and students should maintain a critical stance towards the assigned readings."
Fr. Michael Morton, "Catholic Modernism (1896-1914)"

 
Catholicism-related controversies